Waseda may refer to:

 Waseda University
 Waseda-SAT2
 9350 Waseda
 Waseda El Dorado

People with the surname
, Japanese swimmer

See also 
 Waseda Station (disambiguation)

Japanese-language surnames